Edge Falls is a BBC Radio 4 comedy set in a retail park written by Paul Barnhill and Neil Warhurst, starring Mark Benton and Sarah Lancashire (series 1 only).

Cast
 Mick - Mark Benton
 Sonya - Sarah Lancashire / Frances Barber (Series 2)
 Rez - Emil Marwa
 Valerie - Sarah Hadland
 Colin - Anthony Glennon
 Milosh - John Dougall / Stephen Critchlow (Series 2)
 Tina - Jasmine Callan

The authors, Paul Barnhill and Neil Warhurst, also appear as important extra characters in most episodes.

Episodes
A total of eleven episodes were aired across two series.

Series 1

Series 2

References

External links

2007 radio programme debuts
BBC Radio comedy programmes
BBC Radio 4 programmes